Manoranjan Tv is a Hindi movie and story channel Comedy show

Current shows 
Magical Stories
Kissey Kahaniyan

Chottu Dada
Zabardast Kahaniyan
Chotti Didi

Majedaar kahaniyan

Animated
 The Jungle Book

 Vir The Robot Boy
 Chacha Bhatija
 Peter Pan

Former Programing
Majedaar kahaniyan

Animated
 Watch cars 
Supa Strikas
 Grizzy and The Lemmings
Gormiti
Super King
Mighty Raju

References

Television channels and stations established in 2017
Television stations in New Delhi
Manoranjan Group

Movie channels in India